Gorazd Štangelj (born 27 January 1973 in Novo Mesto) is a Slovenian former professional road bicycle racer, who raced as a professional between 1997 and 2011. He currently works as a directeur sportif for UCI WorldTeam .

Major results

1991
 1st Overall Tour de l'Abitibi
1993
 3rd Overall Tour de Slovénie
1st Stage 1 (ITT)
1994
 1st GP Kranj
 1st Stage 2 Giro delle Regioni
1995
 3rd Overall Tour de Normandie
1996
 1st Giro del Belvedere
 2nd Trofeo Banca Popolare di Vicenza
1997
 3rd Road race, National Road Championships
 5th GP Kranj
1998
 1st Overall GP Kranj
1st Stage 2
 1st Stage 5 Niedersachsen-Rundfahrt
 2nd Road race, National Road Championships
 2nd Overall Tour de Slovénie
 3rd Overall Course Cycliste de Solidarnosc et des Champions Olympiques
1st Stage 2
 3rd Grand Prix Herning
 5th GP Aarhus
 8th Gran Premio Bruno Beghelli
1999
 1st Overall Commonwealth Bank Classic
 3rd GP du canton d'Argovie
2000
  1st  Road race, National Road Championships
 1st Trofeo Melinda
 4th Overall Tour of Austria
1st Stage 2b
 5th Overall Grand Prix du Midi Libre
1st Stage 5
 5th Paris–Tours
 6th Giro del Lazio
 6th Giro dell'Emilia
 7th Giro della Provincia di Lucca
 9th Giro di Lombardia
2001
 1st Giro di Toscana
 8th Giro della Provincia di Siracusa
 9th Trofeo Melinda
 9th Giro del Friuli
 10th Veenendaal–Veenendaal
 10th GP Industria & Commercio di Prato
2002
 10th Giro del Friuli
2003
 5th Coppa Sabatini
2005
 7th Giro di Lombardia
2006
 10th Overall Tour de Slovénie
2007
 1st Stage 1 (TTT) Tour de Pologne
 10th Gran Premio Bruno Beghelli
2008
 1st Stage 1 (TTT) Vuelta a España
2009
 4th Tre Valli Varesine
 10th Overall Tour de Slovénie
2010
 1st  Road race, National Road Championships
2011
 4th Road race, National Road Championships
 10th Giro del Friuli

Grand Tour general classification results timeline

References

External links 
 

1973 births
Living people
Slovenian male cyclists
Olympic cyclists of Slovenia
Cyclists at the 2004 Summer Olympics
Sportspeople from Novo Mesto
Slovenian cycling coaches